is a railway station located in the city of Ishinomaki, Miyagi Prefecture, Japan, operated by East Japan Railway Company (JR East).

Lines
Watanoha Station is served by the Ishinomaki Line, and is located 35.9 kilometers from the terminus of the line at Kogota Station.

Station layout
The station has two opposed side platforms connected to the station building by a level crossing.

Platforms

History
Watanoha Station opened on October 7, 1939. Operations of the line and the station were suspended by the 2011 Tōhoku earthquake and tsunami of March 11, 2011. Services were resumed from Ishinomaki Station to Watanoha on March 17, 2012, and from Watanoha to Urashuku Station on March 16, 2013; but remained suspended on the portion from Urashuku Station to Onagawa Station until August 6, 2016.

Adjacent stations 
 JR East
 Ishinomaki Line・Senseki-Tohoku Line
 Rapid・Local
  - Sta.Watanoha -

Surrounding area
Ishinomaki City Hall Watanoha branch office

Mangokuura Port
Watanoha Post Office

Passenger statistics
In fiscal 2018, the  station was used by an average of 543 passengers daily (boarding passengers only).

See also
 List of railway stations in Japan

References

External links

 

Railway stations in Miyagi Prefecture
Ishinomaki Line
Railway stations in Japan opened in 1939
Stations of East Japan Railway Company
Ishinomaki